The 2022 season is the 103rd season of Syracuse University fielding a men's varsity soccer team. It was the program's 10th season in the Atlantic Coast Conference, and their 13th season with Ian McIntyre as the head coach of the program. Syracuse played their home matches at SU Soccer Stadium in Syracuse, New York.

The 2022 season was the most successful season in program history. It was the first time a team from the university reached the NCAA Division I men's soccer tournament championship game going on to defeat #13 Indiana, 7-6 on penalties after a 2-2 draw. It was the program's first national soccer title since 1936.

Background

The Orange finished the season 8–8–2 overall and 2–5–1 in ACC play to finish in fifth in the Atlantic Division.  As the tenth overall seed in the ACC Tournament, they lost to North Carolina in the First Round.  They were not invited to the NCAA Tournament.

Player Movement

Players Leaving

Players Arriving

Incoming Transfers

Recuriting Class

Squad

Roster

Team management

Source:

Schedule 

|-
!colspan=6 style=""| Preseason

|-
!colspan=6 style=""| 
|-

|-
!colspan=6 style=""| 
|-

|-
!colspan=6 style=""| 
|-

|-

Awards and honors

2023 MLS Super Draft

Source:

Rankings

References

External links 
 Syracuse Men's Soccer

2022
2022 Atlantic Coast Conference men's soccer season
American men's college soccer teams 2022 season
2022 in sports in New York (state)
2022 NCAA Division I Men's Soccer Tournament participants
2022
2022